San Pedro, Albacete is a municipality in Albacete, Castilla–La Mancha, Spain. It has a population of 1,319. It is located 36 kilometers from Albacete.
Nearby towns: Pozuelo, Balazote or Casas de Lázaro.

Tourism
• In San Pedro stands the church of St. Peter the Apostle. Its construction is based on a central nave and the tower of the church, which was completed in 1846, the year in which San Pedro became independent and was established as a municipality.

 Stresses also the town hall was renovated for over a decade.
 In San Pedro you can rest and spend the day in the parks of "La fuente" and "Cañada juncosa".
 You can also go to Peñica,a small lookout rock where there are the water tanks of the village. From where you can see all of San Pedro and the municipality.

Celebrations
 San Pedro has the festivities in honor of San Pedro (29 June) from late June to early July, at this time we celebrate the procession of the image pattern by taking the streets.
 It also has the festivities of Pilar (12 October), also patron of San Pedro

Customs
 "Iluminarias" in honor of Santa Lucia where they make many fires around town, the day of San Isidro, which hosts competitions food and tractors, etc..

History
 San Pedro was once a watering hole for animals with water from the river "Quéjola". It was also a stopping place for hikers and herders.

Gastronomy
 Highlights include "fritillas", "ajo de mataero", "caracoles en su salsa", "atascaburras", "tajás de cerdo", "ajopringue" and "pisto".

Curiosities
 "La Luz del Pardal" is a paranormal phenomenon that occurs in the road connecting the town of San Pedro with Casas de Lázaro, near the river Quéjola.

References

Municipalities of the Province of Albacete